Água Longa is a civil parish in the municipality of Santo Tirso, Portugal. The population in 2011 was 2,207, in an area of 12.87 km².

References

Freguesias of Santo Tirso